Herman William Nickel (born October 23, 1928) was an American diplomat who served as United States Ambassador to South Africa from 1982 to 1986.  He was born in Berlin, Germany and graduated from Union College in Schenectady, New York in the United States in 1951. Nickel married Phyllis Fritchey, daughter of Clayton Fritchey, and had one son, Clayton A. Nickel. He then received a Bachelor of Laws from the Syracuse University College of Law.

Career 
President Ronald Reagan announced his intention to nominate Nickel for the post on 24 February 1982.  Nickel presented his credentials on April 20, succeeding William B. Edmondson in the post. He was succeeded by Edward Perkins in 1986. 

Nickel was a correspondent for Time, Inc. in South Africa, Tokyo, London, and Bonn prior to his appointment.

References

1928 births
Living people
Union College (New York) alumni
Syracuse University College of Law alumni
Ambassadors of the United States to South Africa
German emigrants to the United States